The Itbayat language or Itbayaten (also known generically as Ibatan) is an Austronesian language, in the Batanic group, spoken in the Batanes Islands, Philippines.

Phonology

Vowels 

Consonants 

 /f/ is only used in loanwords but tends to become /p/.

Grammar

Pronouns 
The following set of pronouns is found in the Itbayat language.

References

Further reading

 

Batanic languages
Languages of Batanes